This is a list of episodes from the first season of King of the Hill, which aired on Fox from January 12 to May 11, 1997 for 12 episodes.

Production
The showrunner for the season was Greg Daniels.

Music
Work on the show's background music began in January 1997, the same month that it commenced airing. The show's production company, Judgmental Films, hired seven composers to write the music to the first 13 episodes. Among the seven composers were the band The Refreshments, who also composed the opening and closing themes that appear in every episode. The producers gave each composer one or two episodes to do whilst they were looking for the style that would best suit the program, eventually settling on John O'Connor and Roger Neill. Ron Wasserman, who composed the theme songs for Mighty Morphin' Power Rangers and X-Men: The Animated Series, was interested in composing for the show and submitted acoustic guitar music during pre-production, although he would not end up being chosen as one of the initial seven composers on the first season. For the first season and beyond, the show's background music would typically be done three weeks before episodes went to air.

Broadcast history
The season originally aired Sundays at 8:30–9:00 p.m. (EST) on the Fox Broadcasting Company. It aired following The Simpsons, another adult animated series. 

On August 1, 1997, King of the Hill'''s first season premiered on Channel 4 in the United Kingdom. In Australia, the season began airing on the Seven Network on November 23, 1997, and was also aired on Fox8 the following year. In 1998, a French-Canadian dub of this season began airing in Quebec. This dub removed the Texas references and set the show in rural Quebec, changing the names of all characters and locations. It continued up until the eight season.

 Reception 
In December 1997, Entertainment Weekly critic Ken Tucker named King of the Hill as one of the best shows to debut that year. He wrote, "it was a good year for new cartoons, but I'll take King of the Hill bracing openheartedness over South Park's clever but monotonous heartlessness any time. TV’s most original, complicated new character was Hank Hill—middle-class Texan, political conservative, social libertarian, Willie Nelson fan—who exploded every white-guy small-screen stereotype in place since Archie Bunker."

In his 1997 review for the Pilot episode, Howard Rosenberg of the Los Angeles Times wrote, "whereas The Simpsons sees animation as an opportunity to expand physical reality and tour plot realms far beyond the resources of regular sitcoms, King of the Hill is visually myopic in its storytelling." Rosenberg also wrote that King of the Hill lacked "the panoramic vision and often slashing irreverence and social observances of The Simpsons, which, although not the hilarious achiever it once was, remains a cleverly written farce and commentary on pop culture. On Sunday, for example, hapless Homer's eyewitness reports of an eerily glowing, ghostly figure in the night bring Dana Scully and Fox Mulder of Fox's own The X-Files to Springfield [in] a series whose points of reference, from sci-fi to goofy TV newscasters, are as topical and eclectic as ever." Rosenberg added that, "despite being more conventionally humanoid and recognizable than the exotic universe of The Simpsons, the premiere of King of the Hill is light on media signposts, limiting itself pretty much to benign mentions of NBC's Seinfeld." 

In June 1997, Katy Daigle of the Hartford Courant considered the show to be an improvement over Mike Judge's other animated series Beavis and Butt-Head, claiming that, "it isn’t much better drawn than B&B, but it has substance to its consistently on-target humor." In February 1997, Faye Zuckerman of The New York Times described the show as "The Simpsons meets Beavis and Butthead'' in the Texas ‘burbs", adding that, "the Hills’ indiscretions will find you giggling and getting some vicarious pleasure over the family’s ignorance-is-bliss behavior."

Cast and characters

Main cast 

 Mike Judge as Hank Hill / Boomhauer / Stuart Dooley (voice)
 Kathy Najimy as Peggy Hill (voice)
 Pamela Adlon as Bobby Hill / Clark Peters (voice)
 Brittany Murphy as Luanne Platter / Joseph Gribble (voice)
 Johnny Hardwick as Dale Gribble (voice)
 Stephen Root as Bill Dauterive / Buck Strickland (voice)
 Toby Huss as Cotton Hill / Kahn Souphanousinphone, Sr. / Joe Jack / Additional voices (voice)

Guest stars 

 Willie Nelson as Himself (voice)
 Dennis Hopper as Himself (voice)
 Chuck Mangione as Himself (voice)
 Laurie Metcalf as Cissy Cobb (voice)
 Jennifer Coolidge as Miss Kremzer (voice)

Episodes

Home media
The season was released on DVD in Region 1 (North America) by 20th Century Fox Home Entertainment in 2003. In Region 2 (the United Kingdom) and Region 4 (Australia/New Zealand), it was released during 2006. It is the only season of the show to be released on DVD in Japan, with the Japanese release featuring a dubbed version. The second season was also dubbed, and aired on Japanese television, but was never released on DVD in the country. The original 2003 DVD release for Region 1 included three DVD cases in a cardboard box, as did the Region 2 release. The Region 4 release instead held all the season's discs in a single case. In 2010, the Region 1 DVD was reissued with similar packaging to the Region 4 release.

The season two episode "The Company Man" is included on DVD releases due to its production code. On Hulu and most television reruns, this episode is still ordered as part of the second season.

References

1997 American television seasons
King of the Hill 01